Stauch is a German surname that appears to have originated in the vicinity encompassing the German state of Baden-Württemberg and the Swiss canton of Thurgau. Some branches of the family that emigrated to the United States of America anglicized it to Stough.

People with this surname include:

Alfred Stauch, ichthyologist (Bothus, Chiloglanis, Chiloglanis benuensis, Chiloglanis voltae, Dagetichthys lakdoensis, Dalophis, Dasyatis, Eleotridae, Niger stingray, Phractura, Spinycheek sleepers, Zaireichthys, Zaireichthys camerunensis)
August Stauch, Swiss railway worker, amateur mineralogist, prospector and investor (instigator of the early 20th-century diamond rush in German South-West Africa)
Birgit Stauch, German sculptor
Bonnie Stauch, American costume designer (The Walking Dead: Cold Storage)
Catherine Stauch, American restaurateur (almost became a co-owner of the Ho-Ho-Kus Inn in 2009)
Christopher W. Stauch, American property owner (former co-owner of the George Baker House)
Edward Stauch, American painter/sculptor (creator of Hospital Gangrene of an Arm Stump, this painting and Night at the Horticultural Center in Philadelphia)
Harald Stauch, German politician (member of the Christian Democratic Union)
Hellmut Wilhelm E. Stauch, German-South African watercraft designer (O-Jolle) and Olympian (sailor in the 1952 Summer Olympics and 1960 Summer Olympics)
Jeff Stauch, American civil engineer (engineer for Union County, Ohio in 2009)
Jiri Stauch, Czech basketball player (member of Czechoslovakia's 1975 EuroBasket team)
John H. Stauch, American property owner (former co-owner of the George Baker House)
Richard Stauch, German music composer (The Star of Valencia)
Robert Stauch, German politician (member of the Christian Democratic Union)
Scott Stauch, American football player (one-season member of the New Orleans Saints)
Thomen Stauch, German drummer (member of the bands Blind Guardian, Coldseed, Iron Savior, Savage Circus and Seelenzorn)
Tom Stauch, American aircraft owner (former owner of the Chester Jeep)
Svea Stauch, comic book artist (cover of Comico's Macross#1)
Werner Stauch, German botanist (Selenicereus anthonyanus)
Willi Stauch, German motorcycle racer (1980 European solo grasstrack champion)

References

German-language surnames
Lists of people by surname